Renu Setna is a British actor. His roles on television include the shopkeeper Mr. Kittel in In Sickness and in Health. and Only Fools and Horses as Mr. Ram

Career
Setna began his acting career after winning a scholarship to RADA in 1960. He has played roles in productions from Delhi, Pune, Mumbai, Calcutta, Hyderabad and Bangalore. Before this he was employed building houses as a manual labourer in the 1950s.

Setna has appeared in some of Britain's most successful television series: Z-Cars, Doomwatch, I, Claudius, Cloud Burst, It Ain't Half Hot Mum, Only Fools and Horses, Doctor Who, Crossroads, The Bill, Open All Hours, Are You Being Served?, Some Mothers Do 'Ave 'Em, In Sickness and in Health, Minder, Holby City, Silent Witness and Collision.
Renu Setna's stage work includes Khahil Gibran at the Commonwealth Theatre in London, Shakespeare roles , Gandhi directed by Peter Stevenson with John Castle in the title role at the Tricycle Theatre, and the role of the Chaplain in Mother Courage and Her Children by Bertolt Brecht also directed by Peter Stevenson for Internationalist Theatre for which he gained good notices in The Stage.

On 19 May 2003, Setna was quoted in BBC News alongside Albert Moses saying that British programmes should be hiring British Asian actors rather than actors from India.

Roles
Setna is known for playing Asian characters in British television and films.

He lives in Wimbledon, London, England.

References

External links
 
 https://www.arthur-conan-doyle.com/index.php?title=Renu_Setna

Alumni of RADA
Living people
Male actors from Karachi
Naturalised citizens of the United Kingdom
British male stage actors
British male film actors
British male television actors
20th-century British male actors
21st-century British male actors
Parsi people
British male actors of Indian descent
Indian emigrants to the United Kingdom
British people of Parsi descent
British Zoroastrians
Year of birth missing (living people)